Chaudhry Aamir Sultan Cheema is a Pakistani politician who was a member of the National Assembly of Pakistan from February 2019 until November 2022. Previously he was a Member of the Provincial Assembly of Punjab, between 1988 and May 2018. He is son of Chaudhary Anwar Ali Cheema, former Federal Minister of Industries and Production and seven times consecutive Member of the National Assembly of Pakistan between 1985–2013 which is a unique honour. He represented the PML(Q) party.[1]. Anwar Ali Cheema held the office of Federal Minister of health for few days and was then made Federal Minister of Production. He was given the title of Shehanshah-e-Tameerat(King of Development) for his works in his constituency and Sargodha city.

Wife of Chaudhry Aamir Sultan Cheema, Mrs Tanzila Aamir Cheema was elected to the National Assembly of Pakistan as a candidate of Pakistan Muslim League (Q) on a seat reserved for women from Punjab in the Pakistani general election, 2002.[2][3]

She was re-elected to the National Assembly of Pakistan as a candidate of Pakistan Muslim League (Q) on a seat reserved for women from Punjab in 2011.[4][5]

His son Muhammad Muneeb Sultan Cheema is a sitting member of the Provincial Assembly of Punjab from PTI.

Early life and education
He was born on 1 May 1962 in Sargodha to Anwar Ali Cheema.

He did his early education from Atchison College. He graduated in 1986 from Government College, Sargodha and has a degree of Bachelor of Arts.

Political career

He was elected to the Provincial Assembly of the Punjab as a candidate of Islami Jamhoori Ittehad (IJI) from Constituency PP-28 (Sargodha) in 1988 Pakistani general election.

He was re-elected to the Provincial Assembly of Punjab from Constituency PP-28 (Sargodha) in 1990 Pakistani general election. He was inducted into the provincial Punjab cabinet of Chief Minister Ghulam Haider Wyne and was made Provincial Minister of Punjab for Livestock and Dairy Development.

He was re-elected to the Provincial Assembly of the Punjab as a candidate of Pakistan Muslim League (N) (PML-N) from Constituency PP-28 (Sargodha) in 1997 Pakistani general election.

He was re-elected to the Provincial Assembly of the Punjab as a candidate of Pakistan Muslim League (Q) (PML-Q) from Constituency PP-32 (Sarghoda-V) in 2002 Pakistani general election. He received 47,007 votes and defeated Naveed Akram, a candidate of Pakistan Peoples Party (PPP). In January 2003, he was inducted into the provincial Punjab cabinet of Chief Minister Chaudhry Pervaiz Elahi and was made Provincial Minister of Punjab for Irrigation and Power.

He was re-elected to the Provincial Assembly of the Punjab as a candidate of PML-Q from Constituency PP-32 (Sarghoda-V) in 2008 Pakistani general election. He received 48,522 votes and defeated Mian Muhammad Khalid Kalyar, a candidate of PPP.

He was re-elected to the Provincial Assembly of the Punjab as a candidate of PML-Q from Constituency PP-32 (Sargodha-V) in 2013 Pakistani general election. He received 55,358 votes and defeated Malik Shoaib Awan, a candidate of PML-N.

In April 2018, he announced to quit PML-Q and join Pakistan Tehreek-e-Insaf (PTI).

He was elected to the National Assembly of Pakistan as a candidate of PTI from Constituency NA-91 (Sargodha-IV) in by-election held in February 2019.

He is a member of the National Assembly Standing Committees on Energy and Government Assurances.

References

Living people
Punjab MPAs 2013–2018
1962 births
Punjab MPAs 1988–1990
Punjab MPAs 1990–1993
Punjab MPAs 1997–1999
Punjab MPAs 2002–2007
Punjab MPAs 2008–2013
Pakistan Muslim League (N) MPAs (Punjab)
Pakistan Muslim League (Q) MPAs (Punjab)
Pakistani MNAs 2018–2023